Saint-Christophe Vallée d'Aoste (usually referred to as Vallée d'Aoste) was an Italian association football club, based in Saint-Christophe, Aosta Valley, but playing in Aosta. Vallée d'Aoste competed once in Lega Pro Seconda Divisione me in the 2012–13 season, only being immediately relegated back to Serie D.

The club was disbanded in 2016.

History

Foundation
The club is the main football team of sports club Unione Polisportiva Saint-Christophe A.S.D. that was founded in 1971 as Saint-Christophe Calcio and includes also sections of athletic and tennis.

In summer 2010, the club, that had just been promoted for the first time from Eccellenza Piedmont and Aosta Valley to Serie D, changed its name to the current one, in memory of the former main team in the region, Valle d'Aosta Calcio, that just went bankrupt.

In the 2010–11 season the club gains access to the promotion play-off for Lega Pro Seconda Divisione, where it is beaten and eliminated by Rimini with the result of 3–1 in the last match of "Triangular 2" in the third round.

In the 2011–12 Serie D season, Vallée d'Aoste was promoted for the first time to Lega Pro Seconda Divisione. The club changed its name to the current one in order to represent the whole Aosta Valley.

The club was dissolved in 2016.

Colors and badge
The team's colors are white and claret.

References

External links
Official Site

Football clubs in Italy
Football clubs in Piedmont and Aosta Valley
Association football clubs established in 1971
Association football clubs disestablished in 2016
Serie C clubs
1971 establishments in Italy
2016 disestablishments in Italy